The women's 48 kg competition in judo at the 1992 Summer Olympics in Barcelona was held on 2 August at the Palau Blaugrana. The gold medal was won by Cécile Nowak of France.

Results

Main brackets

Pool A

Pool B

Repechages

Repechage A

Repechage B

Final

Final classification

References

External links
 

W48
Judo at the Summer Olympics Women's Extra Lightweight
Olympics W48
Judo